Gigantosciapus is a genus of flies in the family Dolichopodidae.

Species
 Gigantosciapus africanus (Parent, 1933)
 Gigantosciapus anomalipes (Parent, 1935)
 Gigantosciapus decellei (Vanschuytbroeck, 1966)
 Gigantosciapus francoisi Grichanov, 1998
 Gigantosciapus gemmarius (Walker, 1849)
 Gigantosciapus inversus (Curran, 1927)
 Gigantosciapus kamerunensis (Becker, 1923)
 Gigantosciapus meyeri (Vanschuytbroeck, 1962)
 Gigantosciapus nataliae Grichanov, 1998
 Gigantosciapus oldroydi Grichanov, 1997
 Gigantosciapus pseudogemmarius (Parent, 1933)
 Gigantosciapus saegeri (Vanschuytbroeck, 1959)
 Gigantosciapus tuberculatus (Curran, 1927)

References 

Dolichopodidae genera
Sciapodinae
Diptera of Africa